A Centre of Endemism is an area in which the ranges of restricted-range species overlap, or a localised area which has a high occurrence of endemics. Centres of endemism may overlap with biodiversity hotspots which are biogeographic regions characterized both by high levels of plant endemism and by serious levels of habitat loss. The exact delineation of centres of endemism is difficult and some overlap with one another. Centres of endemism are high conservation priority areas.

Examples of Centres of Endemism

Tanzania

A local centre of endemism is focussed on an area of lowland forests around the plateaux inland of Lindi in SE Tanzania, with between 40 and 91 species of vascular plants which are not found elseware.

Southern Africa

There are at least 19 centres of plant endemism, including the following:

 Albany Centre of Plant Endemism
 Barberton Centre of Plant Endemism
 Cape Floristic Region
 Drakensberg Alpine Centre
 Hantam–Roggeveld Centre of Plant Endemism
 Kaokoveld Centre of Endemism
 Maputaland Centre of Plant Endemism
 Pondoland Centre of Plant Endemism
 Sekhukhuneland Centre of Endemism
 Soutpansberg Centre of Plant Endemism

See also
List of ecoregions with high endemism

References

Endemism